Kamienica Polska  is a village in Częstochowa County, Silesian Voivodeship, in southern Poland. It is the seat of the gmina (administrative district) called Gmina Kamienica Polska.

The village has a population of 1,456.

External links 
 Jewish Community in Kamienica Polska on Virtual Shtetl

References

Kamienica Polska